The 1917–18 Marquette Blue and Gold men's basketball team represented the Marquette University during the 1917–18 NCAA college men's basketball season. The head coach was John Ryan, coaching in his first season.

Schedule

|-

Statistics
Al Delmore 5.1 ppg

References

Marquette Golden Eagles men's basketball seasons
Marquette
Marq
Marq